La Salle, Texas may refer to:

La Salle, Jackson County, Texas, an unincorporated community
La Salle, La Salle County, Texas, a former community, absorbed into Cotulla
La Salle, Limestone County, Texas, a former community on Farm Road 1953

See also
La Salle County, Texas
La Salle (disambiguation)